The Sal Island Super Cup (Portuguese: Super Copa da Ilha do Sal, Capeverdean Crioulo, ALUPEC or ALUPEK: Super Kopa da Idja du Sal, Sal Crioulo: Super Taça Dja d'Sal São Vicente Crioulo: Super Kopa da Ilha d' Sal) is a SuperCup competition played during the season in the island of Sal, Cape Verde.  The competition is organized by the Sal Regional Football Association (Associação Regional de Futebol de Sal, ARFS).  The regional winner competes with the cup winner. Sometimes, if a champion also has a cup title, a cup club who is runner-up qualifies.

The first super cup competition began in 2000.

Since 2012, the super cup is also known as Supertaça Sança Gomes.

Académico do Aeroporto has likely won the most Super Cup titles on the island.

The upcoming super cup edition will feature Palmeira, to qualify as champions and Santa Maria, to qualify as a cup winner.

Winners

Performance By Club

Listed titles only

Performance by area
Listed titles only.  Italics indicate that the super cup competition is not yet held as two participants are based in the same area.

See also
Sal Island Cup
Sal Island Opening Tournament
Sal Island League
Sports in Sal, Cape Verde

References

External links
Historic cup results at RSSSF

Sport in Sal, Cape Verde
Football cup competitions in Cape Verde
2000 establishments in Cape Verde